Under the Radar is the 12th studio album by the American rock band Little Feat, released in 1998 (see 1998 in music). It was the fifth studio album since the band reunited in 1988, and the second since vocalist Shaun Murphy joined the group.

Track listing
"Home Ground" (Barrère) – 4:07
"Eden's Wall" (Barrère, Murphy, Payne) – 6:33
"A Distant Thunder" (Barrère, Murphy, Payne) – 5:36
"Hoy Hoy" (Barrère, Murphy, Payne, Tackett) – 4:08
"Under The Radar" (Barrère, Murphy, Payne) – 7:14
"Vale Of Tears" (Barrère, Murphy, Payne, Takett) – 6:11
"Loco Motives" (Barrère, Murphy, Payne, Takett) – 5:16
"Ferocious Morning" (Barrère, Murphy, Payne, Tackett) – 6:06
"Voiceless Territory (Intro to Falling Through the Worlds)" (Barrère, Murphy, Payne, Tackett) – 0:49
"Falling Through the Worlds" (Barrère, Murphy, Payne, Tackett) – 5:55
"The Blues Don't Tell It All" (Murphy, Payne) – 6:14
"I Got Happiness" (Barrère, Murphy) – 4:32
"Calling The Children Home" (Barrère, Payne, Tackett) – 7:51

Japan bonus track
"Cat Fever (Live Version)"

Personnel

Little Feat
Paul Barrère – vocals, guitar, dobro, dulcimer, harmonica
Sam Clayton – percussion, backing vocals
Kenny Gradney – bass, backing vocals
Richie Hayward – drums, backing vocals
Shaun Murphy – vocals, tambourine
Bill Payne – keyboards, vocals
Fred Tackett – guitar, dobro, trumpet, backing vocals

Texicali Horns
on tracks 1, 2, 13

Darrell Leonard – trumpet, trombonium
Joe Sublett – saxophone

Additional personnel
Lenny Castro – percussion (tracks 1,2)
Piero Mariani – percussion (tracks 10,11,13)

References

1998 albums
Little Feat albums
Albums produced by Bill Payne